Robert Neville may refer to:

Robert Neville (bishop) (1404–1457), English bishop
Robert Neville (journalist) (1905–1970), American war correspondent
Robert Cummings Neville (born 1939), theologian-philosopher
Robert Neville (politician), MP for Yorkshire
Robert Neville (character), the protagonist of the science-fiction horror novel I Am Legend and its various film adaptations

See also
Robert Nevil, musician
Robert de Neville (died 1282), English nobleman